El Tiempo del Descuento is a Spanish reality show produced by Zeppelin TV and broadcast on Telecinco on 12 January 2020. In this show, several Gran Hermano VIP 7 housemates return to the house in Guadalix de la Sierra, overcome the past and fight together to solve their unfinished business. The final prize of the show is 30,000 Euros. In addition, the show has a similar format to the previous Gran Hermano shows, featuring weekly tasks, head of the house, nominations and evictions.

Due to sponsor withdrawal during the airing of Gran Hermano VIP 7 after the "Carlota incident" exploded which happened in Gran Hermano 18, the second season of Gran Hermano Dúo was cancelled. It resulted that Telecinco does not have a live reality show to broadcast in early 2020. And because of the success of the Gran Hermano VIP 7, Mediaset Spain and Zeppelin TV launched El Tiempo del Descuento in January 2020, where several former housemates of that season would be gathered in order to resolve their conflicts. The show offers 24 hours online live stream through the online payment platform Mitele Plus.

The main show presented by Jorge Javier Vázquez, and Más Tiempo del Descuento presented by Núria Marín.

Housemates

Nominations table

Notes

Nominations total received

Blind results

Ratings

"Galas"

"Más Tiempo del Descuento"

References

External links 

 Official site on Telecinco.es

Gran Hermano (Spanish TV series)
Telecinco original programming